The 1928–29 Toronto Maple Leafs season featured the Maple Leafs first play-off appearance. After finishing in third position in the Canadian Division, the Maple Leafs defeated the Detroit Cougars before losing to the New York Rangers in the semi-finals.

Offseason

Regular season

Final standings

Record vs. opponents

Schedule and results

Playoffs
In their first play-off appearance the Maple Leafs met the Detroit Cougars in the two game total goals quarter-finals, and won 7–2.

The Leafs next faced the New York Rangers in a best-of-three series, losing 2–0.

Player statistics

Regular season
Scoring

Goaltending

Playoffs
Scoring

Goaltending

Awards and records

Transactions

June 20, 1928: Traded Eddie Rodden to the Boston Bruins for cash
July 17, 1928: Signed Free Agent Joe Primeau
October 1, 1928: Acquired George Horne from the Montreal Maroons for Fred Elliott
October 18, 1928: Acquired Lorne Chabot and $10,000 from the New York Rangers for John Ross Roach
November 27, 1928: Traded Dave Trottier to the Montreal Maroons for $15,000
November 28, 1928: Traded Alex Gray to the Toronto Ravinas of the CPHL for cash
December 12, 1928: Traded Jack Arbour to the London Panthers of the CPHL for cash
January 10, 1929: Acquired Eric Pettinger and Hugh Plaxton from the Boston Bruins for George Owen
January 12, 1929: Signed Free Agent Clem Loughlin
January 20, 1929: Signed Free Agent Red Horner
January 25, 1929: Traded Bill Carson to the Boston Bruins for cash
February 12, 1929: Acquired Baldy Cotton from the Pittsburgh Pirates for Gerry Lowrey and $9,500

See also
1928–29 NHL season

References

Toronto Maple Leafs seasons
Toronto
Toronto